Matthew Allen Campbell (born November 29, 1979) is an American college football coach. He is the head football coach at Iowa State University, a position he has held since the 2016 season. Campbell was head football coach at the University of Toledo from 2011 to 2015. Prior to that, Campbell had been an assistant at Toledo, Bowling Green, and Mount Union. Campbell grew up in Ohio and briefly attended the University of Pittsburgh before transferring to Mount Union, where he played defensive line.

Playing career
Campbell was born in Massillon, Ohio. His father Rick coached football at Jackson High School. Matt played football at rival Perry, which won three conference championships while he was on the team. Campbell initially attended the University of Pittsburgh on an athletic scholarship in 1998, but transferred to the University of Mount Union after a year. At Mount Union, Campbell played on the defensive line between 1999 and 2002. At Mount Union, Campbell played for head coach Larry Kehres, whose teams won three Division III championships during Campbell's career. Campbell himself was twice named to the College Football All-America Team and named Ohio Athletic Conference Defensive Lineman of the Year.

Coaching career
After college, Campbell stayed within Ohio and took a job as a graduate assistant at Bowling Green State University from 2003–2004. While at Bowling Green Scott Pioli, then the director of player personnel for the New England Patriots, offered Campbell an interview for a job at the team, but Campbell declined. Campbell returned to Mount Union for 2005–2006 as offensive coordinator; Mount Union won the Division III championship both years. Campbell then went back to Bowling Green for two years, first as offensive line coach (2007) and then as offensive line coach/run game coordinator (2008). The University of Toledo hired him as the run game coordinator for the 2009 season. This move reunited him with head coach Tim Beckman, defensive coordinator at Bowling Green during Campbell's first stint there.

Toledo
Toledo promoted Campbell to offensive coordinator in 2010. Toledo made Campbell the permanent head coach at the end of 2011 when Beckman departed for the University of Illinois. He was 32 years old and the youngest head coach in the Football Bowl Subdivision. Two weeks into the job, Toledo defeated Air Force in the Military Bowl. Reportedly Campbell passed on a chance to serve on Urban Meyer's staff at Ohio State University. Campbell coached four full seasons at Toledo: 2012–2015, amassing a record of 35–15. The 2015 team peaked at  20 in the AP Poll, including a victory over Arkansas.

Iowa State

Iowa State University named Campbell its head coach on November 29, 2015, his 36th birthday, replacing the fired Paul Rhoads. Campbell signed a six-year, $22.5 million extension with the school on November 27, 2017. Campbell was named the Big 12 Coach of the Year twice. In his second year, Campbell led Iowa State to an 8–5 season that included wins against #3 Oklahoma and #4 TCU. Iowa State won their bowl game that year against the Memphis Tigers in the Liberty Bowl. During his third year at Iowa State, he led the Cyclones to a second 8–5 season. This included a 6–3 record in Big 12 play, their most conference wins in history. In 2018, Campbell was reportedly requested for an interview for the New York Jets NFL team, however, he declined the interview.

In the pandemic-shortened 2020 season, Campbell led the Cyclones to their best season in decades. The Cyclones finished in first place in the Big 12, their first regular-season first-place finish of any sort in 119 years, it was also the first Togetherness Championship in the schools's history. However, they lost the Big 12 title game to Oklahoma. They were selected for the 2021 Fiesta Bowl, the first major-bowl appearance in school history, and defeated Oregon 34-17. They finished ninth in both major polls, the highest final ranking in school history.

On February 8, 2021, Iowa State announced a new contract extension for Campbell through the 2028 season. It was reported that Campbell was offered an eight-year, $68.5 million deal by the Detroit Lions for their head coaching position in 2021, but other reports said that the Lions never put an offer on the table.

Head coaching record

* Departed Toledo for Iowa State before bowl game

Personal life
In the summer of 2022, Campbell served as the Head Coach of the Gilbert 6th grade softball team. The team rallied from a 4-2 third inning deficit to defeat Roland-Story in the championship game.

References

External links
 Iowa State profile

1979 births
Living people
American football defensive linemen
Bowling Green Falcons football coaches
Mount Union Purple Raiders football coaches
Mount Union Purple Raiders football players
Pittsburgh Panthers football players
Toledo Rockets football coaches
Sportspeople from Massillon, Ohio
Coaches of American football from Ohio
Players of American football from Ohio